Bucovina is a Romanian folk metal band formed in Iași in 2000. Since its inception, Bucovina has released four full-length studio albums and one extended play, all of them featuring constant members Florin "Crivăț" Țibu, Bogdan Luparu (both on electric guitar and vocals) and Bogdan "Vifor" Mihu (on drums). Named after the historical region situated in Northern Romania, Bucovina is known for incorporating folkloric elements both in their music and lyrics.

Members 

 Current

 Florin "Crivăț" Țibu – electric guitar, vocals (2000–present)
 Bogdan Luparu – electric guitar, vocals (2001–present)
 Bogdan "Vifor" Mihu – drums (2000–present)
 Jorge Augusto Coan – bass guitar (2013–present)

 Former

 Paolo Cito Caminha – bass guitar (2002–2006)
 Augustin Abiței – bass guitar (2002–2002)
 Tudor "Beks" Murariu – bass guitar (2006–2010)
 Manuel "Maanu" Giugula – keyboards (2008–2013)
 Vlad Ștefan Datcu – bass guitar (2010–2013)

Discography 
Studio albums

 Ceasul aducerii-aminte (2006)
 Sub stele   (2013)
 Nestrămutat (2015)
 Septentrion (2018)
 Suntem Aici (2022)
EPs

 Duh (2010)

References 

Musical groups established in 2000
Romanian black metal musical groups
Romanian folk metal musical groups